The National Society of Blackjacks is a High School Junior Reserve Officer Training Corps leadership program based on the example of General of the Armies John J. Pershing.  The Blackjacks are the high school auxiliary of the National Society of Pershing Rifles.

Mission 

Blackjacks has a twofold mission:

Establish drill units throughout the United States an elite brotherhood of cadets, trained and motivated to protect the ideals of General of the Armies John Joseph Pershing, patron of this organization. As in The National Society of Pershing Rifles, Blackjacks is a nationally affiliated organization dedicated to fostering a brotherhood and maintain a group of highly motivated and proficient individuals.

Prepare a student for college level Reserve Officer Training Corps (ROTC) and entry into the National Society of Pershing Rifles. Blackjacks is a preparatory program for recruits into Pershing Rifles units across the nation, these units contain members of the U.S. Army, U.S. Air Force and U.S. Navy (including the U.S. Marine Corps) ROTC programs and teaches the member the fundamentals of military procedures and conduct. When and if activated in the Pershing Rifles, the cadet receives more training in how to be a better officer, soldier and citizen. Pershing Rifles cadets tend to excel in ROTC and set the standards for others to follow.

Symbols
The symbols of Blackjacks are:

Official Colors – Yellow gold and black are the official colors of Blackjacks. Yellow, the US Cavalry branch color, is symbolic of General of the Armies John J. Pershing’s service as a cavalry officer. Black represents General Pershing’s nickname of “Blackjack” as well as his self-control and discipline.
Coat of Arms – The shield, crossed sabers and torch design with "B" and "J" had been used by the Blackjacks since its founding in 1967. Many of elements of this symbol are similar to that of the Pershing Rifles Coat of Arms.  The official Blackjacks coat of arms consists of the shield, crossed sabers and torch with the inscription "Blackjacks" and the founding date "1967." Shield - represents the readiness of the Blackjack to meet any situation.  The color black signifies wisdom, self-control and discipline. Crossed sabers - are the symbol of the US Cavalry branch and form a chevron, which has been noted as an emblem of service and of helping one another, here representing the spirit of friendship and the cooperative efforts of members in service to their fellow Blackjacks and community. Torch - represents four values inherent to the National Society of Blackjacks.  First, in its entirety, the torch stands for indomitable leadership embodying both the dutiful following of instructions, like true soldiers, and the intelligent issuance of command. It stands also for the eternal flame of true friendship, a fundamental quality inherent within the Society.  The Torch also denotes scholarship and knowledge.
Membership Ribbon – The Membership Ribbon, adopted by the National Society of Blackjacks in 1967, is similar to the Pershing Rifles membership ribbon and denotes exemplary conduct at all times. It is worn on the left breast of the uniform. The six yellow stripes on the membership ribbon, from the wearer's right to left stand for; 
 Respect
 Friendship
 Integrity
 Leadership
 Service
 Scholarship

Membership Shoulder Cord (Fourragère) – The yellow and black Shoulder Cord is a symbol of honor bestowed to the Blackjacks member and is to be worn on the left shoulder.
  Official Flower – The Yellow Rose. Traditionally, this flower represents friendship. The yellow rose symbolizes the Cavalry service of the Society's patron, General of the Armies John Joseph Pershing, who is the role model for the National Society of Blackjacks.

History 

The National Society of Blackjacks was founded on September 13, 1967. Pershing Rifles Company R-7 at the University of Central Missouri in Warrensburg, Missouri established the first known Blackjacks National Headquarters in September 1972. William F. Kuerz became the Blackjacks National Commander. The first Blackjack unit in the Pershing Rifles 7th Regiment was Blackjack Company A-7 at William Christman High School in Independence, Missouri. Company R-7 oversaw the Blackjacks program until the summer of 1975 when it moved to the MacDonald County High School in Anderson, Missouri. The Pershing Rifles National Headquarters assumed control of Blackjacks in the fall of 1976.  Pershing Rifles 4th Regimental Headquarters at Clemson University assumed control of Blackjacks National Headquarters on April 9, 1977.

After the 1970s Blackjacks suffered a slow decline in membership until they ceased to exist.  The National Society of Blackjacks was re-established in 2012 by  Pershing Rifles.

Blackjacks units 
Blackjacks units use a similar Company-Regimental Designation to that of the National Society of Pershing Rifles.

Active 

Company A-4, Camden Military Academy, Camden, South Carolina
Company B-4, Paul R. Brown Leadership Academy in Elizabethtown, North Carolina
Company C-4, Hephzibah Army JROTC unit in Hephzibah, GA 
Company A-8, Southold Navy JROTC Units (Southold HS, Mattituck HS and Greenport HS), Southold, NY
Company B-8, Brentwood Air Force JROTC unit in Brentwood, New York
Company D-8, Riverhead Navy JROTC unit in Riverhead, New York
Company F-8, William Floyd High School Navy JROTC, Mastic Beach, New York
Company D-17, Liberty Magnet High School Army JROTC, Baton Rouge, Louisiana

Inactive 
Blackjacks National Headquarters, Central Missouri State College, Warrensburg, MO; Clemson University, Clemson, SC
Company A-1, BSA/Venture Crew Six, Tremont City, Ohio
Company B-1, Wooster High School, Wooster Ohio (Sponsor P/R Co D-1 University of Akron)
Company C-1, Grove City High School, Grove City, Ohio (Sponsor P/R Co A-1 Ohio State University)
Company A-2, Heelan High School, Sioux City, Iowa
Company B-2, Cretin High School, St. Paul, Minnesota (Sponsor P/R Co E-2 University of Minnesota)
Company A-4, Carol Hayes High School, Birmingham, Alabama (Sponsor P/R Co G-4 Auburn University)
Company E-4, Beaver Creek High School, West Jefferson, North Carolina (Sponsor P/R Co L-4 North Carolina State University)
Company A-6, Baker High School, Satsuma, Alabama (Sponsor P/R Co S-16 Stetson University)
Company B-6, Satsuma High School, Satsuma, Alabama (Sponsor P/R Co S-16 Stetson University)
Company A-7, William Christman High School, Independence, Missouri
Company C-8, Westbury Navy JROTC unit, Westbury, New York
Company T-8, American Military Academy, Guaynabo, Puerto Rico 
Company A-9, South High School, Denver, Colorado (Sponsor P/R 9th Regimental HQ)
Company B-9, Logan Senior High School, Logan, Utah
Company D-17, S.H. Rider High School, Satsuma, Alabama (Sponsor P/R Co T-17 Texas Tech University)

Notes

External links
Blackjacks National Headquarters Website
Biography of General John J. Pershing

Military education and training in the United States
1967 establishments in Nebraska
Honor societies
Pershing Rifles
Student organizations established in 1967